Othala may refer to:

Othala rune, a reconstructed name of the o rune of the Elder Futhark.
Othala (Stargate), a planet in the galaxy of Ida that is home to a colony of Asgard from the science fiction television show Stargate SG-1